Finding Farley is a 2009 documentary directed by Leanne Allison as she and her husband Karsten Heuer travel across Canada in the literary footsteps of the Canadian writer Farley Mowat.

Heuer, a biologist and author, had written a book on his experiences making the documentary Being Caribou, in which he and Allison traveled  by foot across Arctic tundra following a herd of 120,000 Porcupine caribou. After reading a draft of Heuer's account, Mowat invited them to visit him at his summer farm in Cape Breton Island.

From Canmore, 100 kilometres west of Calgary, they canoed to Hudson Bay, visiting many of the settings that Mowat wrote about in Never Cry Wolf, Lost in the Barrens and People of the Deer. From Hudson Bay, their plan was to travel by sea to northern Labrador, the setting of Mowat's stories such as The Serpent's Coil, Grey Seas Under, Sea of Slaughter and A Whale for the Killing. From Newfoundland and Labrador they planned a final journey by water, arriving at Cape Breton near the end of October. Finding Farley was the top film at the 2010 Banff Mountain Film Festival, receiving both the Grand Prize and People's Choice awards.

References

External links
 
Watch Finding Farley at NFB.ca

2009 films
English-language Canadian films
2009 documentary films
Documentary films about canoeing
Documentary films about writers
Films shot in Canada
National Film Board of Canada documentaries
Travelogues
Farley Mowat
Documentary films about Canada
2000s English-language films
2000s Canadian films